Better Interiors is an Indian monthly interior design magazine.

Background 
The magazine was established by Infomedia India on 5 May 2005. Infomedia India was taken over by Indian media and entertainment company Network 18.

Sister publications
 Forbes India, the Indian edition of Forbes
 Overdrive, an Indian monthly automotive magazine
 Better Photography, an Indian magazine for photo enthusiasts.

References

Monthly magazines published in India
Arts and crafts magazines
Magazines established in 2005